Julian Kyer (born May 15, 1988) is an American track and road cyclist. In the 2015 Tour of the Gila, Kyer broke his collarbone.

Major results
Sources:
2008
 United States Masters - individual pursuit (U23)
2009
 United States Masters - Team Pursuit (with Ian Moir, Taylor Phinney and Justin Williams)
2010
 6th Overall Thüringen Rundfahrt der U23
2014
 11th overall USA Pro Cycling Challenge

External links

References

1988 births
Living people
American male cyclists